Innopoli is a large office building in the district of Otaniemi, Espoo, Finland, near the main campus of the Aalto University. Innopoli provides housing for many newly founded Information Technology companies, and some well-known, successful companies such as SSH Communications have started there. A new office building, called Innopoli 2, was constructed later near the original Innopoli building.

External links
 Technopolis Otaniemi

Buildings and structures in Espoo
Office buildings in Finland